Ten minute or Ten minutes may refer to:

Time
Ten Minute Rule, for members of parliament
Flash drama,  or 10 minute play

Films
10 Minutes (2002 film), a 2002 Bosnian short film
 10 Minutes (2013 film), a 2013 South Korean film

Music
"Ten Minutes" (The Get Up Kids song), 1999
"Ten Minutes" (R. Kelly song), an unreleased song
"10 Minutes" (Lee Hyori song), 2003
"10 Minutes" (Inna song), 2010

See also
Ten Minutes Older, a 2002 film project consisting of two compilation feature films titled The Trumpet and The Cello
10 Minute Warning, a hardcore punk band